Into Battle is the fifth book in Garth Nix's The Seventh Tower series, published in 2001 by Scholastic. In this book, the Icecarls are fed up with the Chosen, and prepare to attack the Castle with War-Chief Milla Talon-Hand at the lead. Milla, trained with a Sunstone, and wielding a talon of Danir, is prepared to defend her army from anything, no matter what the cost.

Milla's Icecarl army quickly destroys and conquers the Red and Orange levels, terrorizing all with a Violet Wave of Destruction, produced by her half of the Violet Keystone- which she thinks is just a normal Sunstone at first, but slowly begins reconsidering.

The cover design and art are by Joan Moloney and Steve Rawlings respectively.

2001 novels
Children's fantasy novels
Novels by Garth Nix
2001 fantasy novels
2001 children's books
Australian children's novels